This page lists nationwide public opinion polls that have been conducted relating to the 2008 presidential elections in the Czech Republic.

Even though the election was indirect, there were numerous polls. The STEM agency made polls on ČSSD request while SC&C on ODS request. This cast their polls into doubt.

Polls

Klaus vs Švejnar

Other polls

Klaus's Second term
This lists polls that asked people if they want Václav Klaus as president for Second term.

Media surveys

Klaus vs Dienstbier vs Švejnar

References

Opinion polling for presidential elections in the Czech Republic
2008 Czech presidential election